María Josefa Wonenburger Planells (Montrove, Oleiros, Galicia, July 17, 1927 – A Coruña, June 14, 2014) was a Galician mathematician who did research in the United States and Canada. She is known for her work on group theory. She was the first Spaniard to obtain a Fulbright scholarship for doctoral studies in mathematics.

Biography
Wonenburger's father's family was Alsatian and her mother's family was from Valencia. She had a passion for mathematics from an early age, though her parents wanted her to study engineering so that she could participate in the family business, a foundry. After completing her undergraduate studies at the Universidad Central de Madrid, now known as Complutense University of Madrid, she began her doctoral work there. A Fulbright scholar, her studies took her to Yale University where she completed her Ph.D. in 1957 under Nathan Jacobson. She returned to Spain three years later with a scholarship to Instituto de Matemáticas Jorge Juan del CSIC. At the end of the grant, she moved to Canada where her first PhD student was Robert Moody.

In 1966, she moved to the United States to teach at the University of Buffalo, and the following year, in 1967, she received a permanent post as a professor at the University of Indiana, where she remained until 1983. Because of her mother's illness, she returned to La Coruña in 1983, and remained away from the academic world, except some sporadic collaboration with institutions such as AGAPEMA. Her research mainly focused on group theory and the theory of Lie algebras. She studied the orthogonal group and its corresponding projective group. She directed eight doctoral theses; in addition to Moody, her students included Stephen Berman, Bette Warren, Edward George Gibson, and Richard Lawrence Marcuson.

In 2010, the Galician government and University of A Coruña established the María Josefa Wonenburger Planells Prize in her honor. The award recognizes women with achievements in science and technology.

References

 Souto Salorio, M. J. &  Tarrío Tobar, A.D. (2006). María Josefa Wonenburger Planells. Mujer y matemática. La Gaceta de la RSME 9: 339–364.
search on author MJ Wonenburger from Google Scholar

1927 births
2014 deaths
20th-century Spanish mathematicians
Yale University alumni
People from A Coruña (comarca)
University at Buffalo faculty
Indiana University faculty
Group theory
Women mathematicians
20th-century women scientists
Scientists from Galicia (Spain)